Robert Lee "Bobby" Thomason (March 26, 1928 – November 5, 2013) was an American football quarterback in the National Football League for the Los Angeles Rams, Green Bay Packers, and the Philadelphia Eagles. He was selected to three Pro Bowls.  Thomason played college football at Virginia Military Institute and was drafted in the first round of the 1949 NFL Draft.

Thomason married Jean Pierce in 1951. They had one daughter. Both survived him, as, in 2013, he died of heart failure at the age of 85.

References

1928 births
2013 deaths
People from Albertville, Alabama
American football quarterbacks
Los Angeles Rams players
Green Bay Packers players
Philadelphia Eagles players
Players of American football from Alabama
Eastern Conference Pro Bowl players
VMI Keydets football players